Hollies' Greatest is the only number one album in the UK by British band the Hollies. It was released shortly before Graham Nash's departure from the Hollies and was intended to include all of their British hit singles with Nash, as well as filling in for the lack of an original LP by the group in 1968. Only 3 of the 14 songs on the album – "Stay", "I Can't Let Go" and "Stop! Stop! Stop!" had previously been released on UK albums.

It spent seven weeks at the top of the chart in 1968. In total, it spent 27 weeks in the British LP chart, and is the most successful album by the Hollies.

Track listing
All songs by Clarke-Hicks-Nash, unless otherwise noted.

Side one 
"I Can't Let Go" § (Chip Taylor, Al Gorgoni)
"Bus Stop" (Graham Gouldman)
"We're Through" § (Ransford AKA Clarke-Hicks-Nash)
"Carrie Anne" 
"Here I Go Again" § (Mort Shuman, Clive Westlake)
"King Midas in Reverse"
"Yes I Will" § (Gerry Goffin, Russ Titelman)

Side two
"I'm Alive" § (Clint Ballard Jr.)
"Just One Look" § (Gregory Carroll, Doris Payne)
"On a Carousel"
"Stay" § (Maurice Williams)
"Look Through Any Window" §  (Gouldman, Charles Silverman)
"Stop Stop Stop"
"Jennifer Eccles" (Clarke-Nash)

Personnel
Allan Clarke – vocals, harmonica, guitar
Tony Hicks – lead guitar, vocals
Graham Nash – rhythm guitar, vocals
Bobby Elliott – drums
Eric Haydock – bass guitar on §
Bernie Calvert – bass guitar

Charts

References

External links

The Hollies compilation albums
1968 greatest hits albums
Parlophone compilation albums